Vijendra Narayan Singh is a critic of Hindi Literature.

He has specialized on the critical appreciation of Rashtrakavi Ramdhari Singh 'Dinkar' and his works. He served as Professor and Head of the Hindi Department of Hyderabad Central University.

Apart from these, some of his other works are Kavyalochan ki saasyayen, Ashudh kavya ki sanstuti main, and Bharatiya kavya sameeksha main Vakrokti siddhant.

Works
Bharatiya Sahitya ke Nirmata: Ramdhari Singh 'Dinkar''', Sahitya Akademi, New Delhi, 2005, .Dinkar: Ek Punarmulyankan, Parimal Prakashan, Allapur, Allahabad.Urvashi: Uplabdhi Aur Sima'', Parimal Prakashan, Allapur, Allahabad.

References

Hindi-language writers
Indian literary critics
Living people
Year of birth missing (living people)